This is a list of ancient Anatolian peoples who inhabited most of Anatolia (or Asia Minor).
“Anatolian” here has the meaning of an Indo-European branch of peoples that lived in the Anatolia Peninsula or Asia Minor, although not all ancient peoples that dwelt in this Peninsula were Indo-Europeans.
These peoples were speakers of the Anatolian branch (or subfamily) of the Indo-European language family.

Ancestors

Proto-Indo-Europeans (Proto-Indo-European speakers)
Proto-Anatolians (Indo-European) (Proto-Anatolian speakers)

Hittites (Nesitic / Central Anatolians) 
Hittites / Nesites (𒉈𒅆𒇷 - Nesumines)
Cappadocians? / Leucosyri? (according to Herodotus, Cappadocians and Leucosyri were the same people - Cappadocians was the Persian name and Leucosyri the Greek name) (Cappadocians also inhabited the West Pontus that originally was part of Cappadocia)
Amiseni? (inhabited Themiscyra district in West Pontus)
Cases? / Kases?
West Pontians?

Luwics (Southern Anatolians)
Luwians
Cataonians (possibly assimilated by the Cappadocians in the Classical Age) (in the Bronze Age and early Iron Age, Cataonia was part of the Neo-Hittite kingdoms who were Luwian speaking; however in Classical Antiquity, Strabo states that although they were distinct peoples, they spoke the same language as the Cappadocians)
Cilicians
Danuna - they dwelt in the "Land of the Danuna" (they may have been the inhabitants of Adana, Adaniya or Ataniya city and region, in Cilicia and also they may have been the people called Denyen by the ancient Egyptians, one of the Sea peoples)
Commagenians? (Commagene in early Iron Age had a bilingual population of Luwian and Hurrian, later, with the Assyrian Empire conquest, the region was Assyrianized and was in the cultural sphere of Mesopotamia, later, ancient Armenians also had an important presence in the region; the ancient Romans considered Commagene part of Syria (Roman province), east of the Amanus and south of the Taurus mountains)
Isaurians
Lycaonians
Philistines? (they may have been the people called Peleset by the ancient Egyptians, one of the Sea peoples)
Southwest
Carians
Leleges
Pamphylians (Non-Hellenics)
Pisidio-Sidians
Pisidians / Pamphylians (Pamphylians, on the coast, and Pisidians, in the inland, were the same people and spoke the same language, the difference was that Anatolian Pamphylians were more Greek influenced since Iron Age) (there was an Anatolian Pamphylian dialect, part of the Pisidian language, and a Pamphylian Greek dialect, part of Ancient Greek, depending on the degree of Hellenization)
Homanades (Homana or Homona was their main settlement)
Sidians (in Side region)
Solymoi / Solymi (according to Strabo, this was the older name of the Milyans) (they may have been or not the same people as the Lycians)
Milyans / Milyae ("Lycian B" or “Lycian II” speakers)
Lycians / Termilae (𐊗𐊕𐊐𐊎𐊆𐊍𐊆 – Trm̃mili = Trəmmili (m̃ = əm))
Telchines?

Western Anatolian?
Related to but not part of Luwics
Lydians / Maeonians (Maíones) (𐤮𐤱𐤠𐤭𐤣𐤸𐤯𐤦𐤳 - Śfardẽtis)
Kaystrianoi / Caystriani
Kilbianoi / Cilbiani
Trojans? / Taruisans?

Palaics (Northern Anatolian)
Palaics (in Pala region, northern Anatolia or Asia Minor)
Paphlagonians (mainly in Paphlagonia, roughly matching Pala, northern Anatolia or Asia Minor)
Caucones? / Kaukauni?
Eneti / Heneti?
Mariandyni

Possible Anatolian (Indo-European) peoples
Mysians? (possibly they were more related to the Phrygians, a non Anatolian Indo-European people, and therefore they were possibly not an Anatolian Indo-European people, Mysia was also known as Phrygia Hellespontica, however they probably had a mixing with an Anatolian people closer to the Lydians, which would explain some statements by ancient authors such as Strabo when he stated that Mysian language was, in a way, a mixture of the Lydian and Phrygian languages)
Milatai? / Milatae?

See also

 Anatolians
 List of ancient peoples of Anatolia
 Mitanni
 Kassites
 Purushanda
 Hyksos
 Sea peoples
 Maryannu
 Indo-Aryan superstrate in Mitanni
 Kikkuli
 Ancient Regions of Anatolia

References

Citations

Sources 

Lists of ancient Indo-European peoples and tribes
 
3rd-millennium BC establishments
5th-century disestablishments
Indo-European peoples
Ancient peoples of Anatolia
Peoples of the Caucasus
Ancient Anatolia
Ancient Greece
Ancient history of Turkey